The 2nd Annual Irish Film & Television Awards were hosted by James Nesbitt on 30 October 2004 at the Burlington Hotel, Dublin, honouring Irish film and television released in 2004.

Awards in film

Best Irish Film – Jury Award
 Omagh (Winner)
 Adam & Paul
 Blind Flight
 Inside I'm Dancing
 Man About Dog

Best Director
 Lenny Abrahamson for Adam & Paul (Winner)
 Paddy Breathnach for Man About Dog
 Alan Gilsenan for Timbuktu
 Damien O'Donnell for Inside I'm Dancing
 Pete Travis for Omagh

Best Cinematography
 Mark Garrett for Freeze Frame (Winner)
 Cian de Buitlear for Man About Dog
 PJ Dillon for Timbuktu
 Donal Gilligan for Omagh
 Peter Robertson for Inside I'm Dancing

Best Music
 Ray Harman for Timbuktu (Winner)
 Go Blimps Go for The Halo Effect
 Stephen McKeon for Blind Flight
 Stephen Rennicks for Adam & Paul
 Kevin Shields for Lost in Translation

Best Script
 Jeffrey Caine for Inside I'm Dancing (Winner)
 Lance Daly for The Halo Effect
 Pearse Elliott for Man About Dog
 Guy Hibbert & Paul Greengrass for Omagh
 Mark O'Halloran for Adam & Paul

Best Editing
 Emer Reynolds for Timbuktu (Winner)
 Dermot Diskin for Man About Dog
 Kevin Lavelle for Starfish
 Mairead McIvor for Capital Letters
 Isobel Stephenson for Adam & Paul

Best Production Design
 Ashleigh Jeffers for Freeze Frame (Winner)
 Tom Conroy for Inside I'm Dancing
 Alan Gilsenan for Timbuktu
 Jim Furlong for Cowboys & Angels
 Paki Smith for Man About Dog

Best Hair/Make-up
 Dee Corcoran / Ailbhe Lemass for King Arthur (Winner)
 Barbara Conway / Terry Ralph for The Halo Effect
Bernadette Dooley / Morna Ferguson for Laws of Attraction
 Tom McInerney for Adam & Paul
 Linda Mooney for Man About Dog

Best Costume Design
 Grania Preston for Cowboys & Angels (Winner)
 Joan Bergin for Laws of Attraction
 Lorna Marie Mugan for Inside I'm Dancing
 Lorna Marie Mugan for Man About Dog
 Leonie Prendergast for The Halo Effect

Best Short Film
 Undressing My Mother (Winner)
 Full Circle (2003 film)
 Take It Back
 Two Fat Ladies
 Yu Ming Is Ainm Dom

Awards across TV and film

Best Animation
 Animated Tales of the World: The Boy Who Had No Story (Winner)
 Dublin 1
 God's Early Work
 The Life and Death of Peter Sellers
 Norman Normal 

The Irish Film Board/Northern Ireland Film and Television Commission Award for Best New Talent
 John Simpson for Freeze Frame (Winner)
 Des Bishop for The Des Bishop Work Experience
 Pearse Elliott for Man About Dog
 Karl Geary for Timbuktu
 Allen Leech for Cowboys & Angels

Best Documentary
 Battle of the Bogside (film)|Battle of the Bogside (Winner)
 Christine's Children
 Imagining Ulysses
 Shutdown: The Story of the Ulster Workers Strike 
 Waiting for Houlihan 
 Who Kidnapped Shergar

Best Irish Language Short / Animated Film / Programme
 Yu Ming Is Ainm Dom (Winner)
 Cinegael Paradiso
 Léargas: Ná Lig Sinn i nDearmad
 Ros na Rún
 Tintown

Awards in television

Best Sports Programme
 Final Words: Hurling '03 (Winner) 
 Fearless: 3 Irish Special Olympians  
 Go Racing  
 Martin O'Neill: Man and Bhoy   
 Ringy

Best Lifestyle Programme
 Show Me the Money (Winner)
 Manchán sa Tsín
 The Restaurant
 Three 60
 Wild Trials

Best Entertainment Programme
 The Bronx Bunny Show (Winner)
 Amú
 Close Encounters with Keith Barry
 The Des Bishop Work Experience
 The Panel

Best Current Affairs/News Programme
 Prime Time: "Intellectual Disability" (Winner)
 Prime Time: "Congo Heart of Africa"
 Prime Time: "Ireland's Teenage Criminals"
 Prime Time: "The Lost Generation"
 Spotlight: "Superdollar Plot"

Best TV Drama or Drama Series / Soap
 Holy Cross (Winner)
 The Clinic
 Proof
 The Return
 Ros na Rún

Best Children's/Youth Programme
 Animated Tales of the World: The Boy Who Had No Story (Winner)
 ATL TV
 ID+
 
 Scope

Awards in acting

Best Actor in a Leading Role – Film
 Gerard McSorley for Omagh (Winner)
 Colin Farrell for A Home at the End of the World
 Tom Murphy for Adam & Paul
 Stephen Rea for The Halo Effect
 Karl Shiels for Capital Letters

Best Actor in TV Drama
 Ciarán Hinds for The Mayor of Casterbridge (Winner)
 Simon Delaney for Pulling Moves
 Dylan Moran for Black Books
 James Nesbitt for Wall of Silence
 David Wilmot for The Clinic

Best Actor in a Supporting Role – Film/TV
 Peter O'Toole for Troy (Winner)
 Colum Convey for Holy Cross
 Gary Lydon for The Clinic
 Ciarán Nolan for Man About Dog
 Jim Norton for Proof

Best Actress in a Leading Role – Film
 Eva Birthistle for Ae Fond Kiss… (Winner)
 Eva Birthistle for Timbuktu
 Michèle Forbes for Omagh
 Brenda Fricker for Inside I'm Dancing
 Louise Lewis for Adam & Paul

Best Actress in a TV Drama
 Anne Marie Duff for Shameless (Winner)
 Orla Brady for Proof
 Orla Brady for Servants
 Amanda Burton for Silent Witness
 Niamh Cusack for Too Good to be True

Best Actress in a Supporting Role – Film/TV
 Susan Lynch for 16 Years of Alcohol (Winner)
 Susan Lynch for Bodies
 Rachel Pilkington for The Clinic
 Jasmine Russell for Capital Letters
 Ger Ryan for The Return

People's Choice Awards

The AIB People's Choice Awards For Best Irish Film
 Song for a Raggy Boy (Winner)
 Blind Flight
 Bloom
 Cowboys and Angels 
 Omagh

The Siemens Mobile TV Personality of the Year Award
 Claire Byrne (Winner)
 Gerry Anderson
 Jarlath Burns
 Gerry Kelly
 Derek Mooney
 Gráinne Seoige

The Jameson People's Choice Award for Best International Film
 The Lord of the Rings: The Return of the King (Winner)
 Fahrenheit 9/11
 Lost in Translation
 Mystic River
 The Passion of the Christ

The Pantene People's Choice Award for Best International Actress Award
 Keira Knightley for King Arthur and Pirates of the Caribbean: The Curse of the Black Pearl (Winner)
 Cameron Diaz for Shrek 2
 Scarlett Johansson for Lost in Translation
 Charlize Theron for Monster
 Uma Thurman for Kill Bill: Volume 2

The Avica People's Choice Award for Best International Actor
 Johnny Depp for Pirates of the Caribbean: The Curse of the Black Pearl (Winner)
 Jake Gyllenhaal for The Day After Tomorrow
 Jude Law for Cold Mountain
 Bill Murray for Lost in Translation
 Sean Penn for Mystic River

Outstanding Irish Contribution to Cinema

 Awarded to Pierce Brosnan

Lifetime achievement award

 Awarded to Maureen O'Hara

References 

2004 film awards
2004 in Irish television
2